Noémie Merlant (born 27 November 1988) is a French actress and director. She has been nominated for her performances three times at the César Awards, including a nomination for her breakout role in Portrait of a Lady on Fire and a win for The Innocent.

Career
Merlant was born on 27 November 1988 in Paris. Both of her parents are real estate agents. She was raised in Rezé near Nantes.

Merlant began her career as a professional model before attending the Cours Florent acting school in Paris. 

She had her first breakthrough in the 2016 film Heaven Will Wait for which she was nominated for the César Award for Most Promising Actress.

In 2019 Merlant starred in Portrait of a Lady on Fire. She won the Lumières Award for Best Actress for her performance and was nominated for the César Award for Best Actress alongside her co-star Adèle Haenel.

In 2020 she starred in Zoé Wittock's Jumbo, a film about a woman who falls in love with an Amusement Park ride. She also starred in Marie-Castille Mention-Schaar's A Good Man. 

In 2022 Merlant plays Francesca Lentini, a musician and personal assistant to the celebrated composer/conductor Lydia Tár (Cate Blanchett) in the movie Tár, directed by Todd Field.

Directing
Merlant has directed two short films, the 2017 film Je suis une biche and the 2019 film Shakira. In 2021 her she made her feature directorial debut with Mi iubita, mon amour

Filmography

Theatre

Discography

Singles
 "Fate" (2016)

References

https://www.imdb.com/title/tt14821328/

External links

 
 Interview with Noémie Merlant on Eurochannel

1988 births
Living people
French film actresses
French television actresses
French stage actresses
21st-century French actresses
Cours Florent alumni
Actresses from Paris
Best Actress Lumières Award winners
Best Supporting Actress César Award winners